Balls of Steel may refer to:

 Balls of Steel (video game), a pinball video game
 Balls of Steel (TV series), a British comedy show hosted by Mark Dolan
 Balls of Steel Australia, Australian TV series based on the British show 
 [[Balls of Steel (Kathy Griffin special)|Balls of Steel (Kathy Griffin special)]], a 2009 stand-up comedy special by comic Kathy Griffin
 Balls of steel'', a common catch-phrase from the videogame character Duke Nukem